Police interceptor may refer to:

 Several police vehicles from the Ford Motor Company, including:
 Ford Police Interceptor Sedan based on the Ford Taurus
 Ford Police Interceptor Utility based on the Ford Explorer
 Ford Crown Victoria Police Interceptor (1992–2011)

Also:
 interceptor-type police car
 Police Interceptors, UK documentary show
 The Pursuit Special from the Mad Max films

See also
Interceptor (disambiguation)